Byron Thomas Tolbert (born October 16, 1965) is an American sports broadcaster and former professional basketball player. He played a total of seven seasons in the National Basketball Association (NBA). After retiring from basketball, Tolbert became a radio show co-host on KNBR in San Francisco and NBA commentator for the television networks NBC, ESPN, and ABC.

Early life
Tolbert graduated from Artesia High School in Lakewood, California in 1983.

College career
Following high school, he played college basketball at the University of California, Irvine (1983–1985), Cerritos College (1985–86), and the University of Arizona (1986–1988). While at Arizona, Tolbert played under coach Lute Olson, helping the team to an appearance in the 1988 Final Four. At Arizona, Tolbert was also a teammate of five-time NBA champion and future Golden State Warriors coach Steve Kerr.

Professional career
In 1988, he was a second-round draft pick (9th pick, 34th overall) of the Charlotte Hornets.

Tolbert spent seven seasons playing for a number of NBA teams, including Charlotte (1988–89, 94–95), the Golden State Warriors (1989–92), the Orlando Magic (1992–93), and the Los Angeles Clippers (1993–94). He also played briefly for Canarias in the Spanish league. He retired following the 1994-95 season after his oldest son was born.

Broadcasting career

Radio
In 1996, Tolbert was hired by KNBR, a San Francisco-based local sports radio station, to co-host a radio talk show titled The Razor and Mr. T with longtime Bay Area sports radio host Ralph Barbieri. The show attracted high ratings in the Bay Area with male listeners aged 25 to 54. The title of the show was changed to The Mr. T Show following the departure of Barbieri from KNBR in the summer of 2012. In 2014, with former San Francisco Chronicle columnist Ray Ratto becoming co-host, the show became Mr. T & Ratto. Beginning in 2019, Tolbert hosted the Tolbert, Krueger & Brooks Show. On February 25, 2022, Larry Kreuger and Rod Brooks were removed from the show.

From December 2012 to the end of the 2016 NBA season, Tolbert joined the Golden State Warriors Radio Network as color commentator alongside play-by-play announcer Tim Roye.

Television
In addition to his radio work in San Francisco, Tolbert was a color commentator for NBA telecasts on NBC. He was nominated for an Emmy in 2002 for his work as a commentator on NBC. Tolbert then worked for ESPN from 2002 to 2007. In 2003, Tolbert - along with Brad Nessler and Bill Walton - called the NBA Finals for ABC.

Personal life
Tolbert lives in Alameda, California with his wife and three children. In 2017, Tolbert suffered an aortic aneurysm and underwent emergency heart surgery. He returned to his radio hosting duties after a week-long recovery.

References

External links

1965 births
Living people
American men's basketball players
American sports radio personalities
American television sports announcers
Arizona Wildcats men's basketball players
Basketball players from Long Beach, California
CB Canarias players
Cerritos Falcons men's basketball players
Charlotte Hornets draft picks
Charlotte Hornets players
Golden State Warriors players
Junior college men's basketball players in the United States
Liga ACB players
Los Angeles Clippers players
National Basketball Association broadcasters
Orlando Magic players
People from Lakewood, California
Power forwards (basketball)
Sportspeople from Alameda, California
UC Irvine Anteaters men's basketball players